This is the results breakdown of the local elections held in Castile and León on 25 May 2003. The following tables show detailed results in the autonomous community's most populous municipalities, sorted alphabetically.

City control
The following table lists party control in the most populous municipalities, including provincial capitals (shown in bold). Gains for a party are displayed with the cell's background shaded in that party's colour.

Municipalities

Ávila
Population: 50,241

Burgos
Population: 167,962

León
Population: 135,794

Palencia
Population: 80,801

Ponferrada
Population: 64,010

Salamanca
Population: 156,006

Segovia
Population: 54,945

Soria
Population: 35,112

Valladolid
Population: 318,576

Zamora
Population: 65,575

See also
2003 Castilian-Leonese regional election

References

Castile and León
2003